Parent article: List of tornadoes and tornado outbreaks

These are some notable tornadoes, tornado outbreaks, and tornado outbreak sequences that have occurred in the Southern Hemisphere including Oceania, and, for the purposes of this list, all of South America and Africa.

Africa

Oceania

Australia

New Zealand

South America

Argentina

Brazil

Chile

Colombia

Paraguay

Uruguay

See also
 List of tornadoes and tornado outbreaks
 Tornado records

Notes

References

External links
 Tornadoes of Australia - past and present
 Australia and Oceania listing by The Tornado Project
 Africa listing by The Tornado Project
 South America listing by The Tornado Project
 Tornadoes in Brazil
 Tornadoes in Australia
 Tornadoes of South America, Australia/New Zealand, and Africa
 

Tornado-related lists